Gujarati Sahitya Parishad is a literary organisation for the promotion of Gujarati literature located in Ahmedabad, Gujarat, India. It was founded by Ranjitram Mehta with the aim of creating literature appealing to all classes of society and cultivating a literary sense among the people. Many prominent people including Mahatma Gandhi and Kanaiyalal Munshi have presided over the organisation. Its headquarters, located on Ashram Road, is known as Govardhan Bhavan. It has a conference hall and library.

Parab is the monthly magazine of the Gujarati Sahitya Parishad and is published on the 10th of every month.

Presidents

Activities 

It published seven volumes of the History of Gujarati Literature, of which the first volume covers a period of 1150 A.D to 1450 A.D. A weekly poetry workshop known as  Budh Sabha is held on every Wednesday at the World Poetry Center of Parishad.

It gives 30 prizes to writers in different genres of literature. The prizes given every two years are:
 Uma-Snehrashmi Prize for the best literary work
 Shri Arvind Prize for the best book on devotional literature
 Kakasaheb Kalelkar Prize for the best book of biography, essays, or travel
 Bhagini Nivedita Prize is given to the best female writer
 Batubhai Umarwadia Prize for the best one-act play
 Jyotindra H. Dave Prize for the best humorous work
 Parmanand Kunvarji Kapadia Prize for the best book on social education
 P. Trivedi Prize for the best book on education
 Ramprasad Bakshi Prize for the best book on poetic or on criticism
 B. M. Mankad Prize for the best amongst writers first publication of poetry, drama, short story or novel
 Harilal Maneklal Desai Prize for the best book on social philosophy or criticism
 Ushnas Prize for the best long poem
 Takhtasinh Parmar Prize for the best amongst writers first publication of poetry, drama, short story or novel
 Natvar Malvi Prize for children's literature
 Annieben Saraiya Prize for the best book on humanity
 Mahendra Bhagat Prize for the best anthology of poem
 Dilip Mehta Prize for the best anthology of ghazals
 Raman Pathak Sashtipurti Prize for the best collection of short stories
 Gopaldas Vidvans Prize for the best translation
 Bhaskarao Vidvans Prize for the best book of sociology
 Ramanlal Soni Prize for the best children's literature book
 Suresh Majumdar Prize for the best female translator
 Ramanlal Joshi Prize for the best book on criticism
 Upendra Pandya Prize for the best Ph.D. thesis
 Prabhashankar Teraiya Prize for the best book in linguistics or grammar
 Pandit Bechardas Jivaraj Dhoshi Prize for the best book on Sanskrit, Prakrit and Gujarati grammar
 Priyakant Parikh Prize for the best novel
 Ramu Pandit Prize for the best book on human relations or economics

References

Gujarati literature
Organisations based in Ahmedabad
Indic literature societies
Non-profit organisations based in India
1905 establishments in India
Book publishing companies of India
Arts organizations established in 1905